Swallow is a surname. Notable people with the surname include:

Alan Swallow (1915–1966), English professor who ran his own publishing company
Andrew Swallow (born 1987), Australian rules footballer with North Melbourne
Andy Swallow (1904–1969), Scottish footballer with St Johnstone, Millwall (born Kregsdis, corruption of kregždė, Lithuanian for Swallow)
Barry Swallow (born 1942), English footballer with Doncaster, Barnsley, Bradford City, York
David Swallow Australian rules footballer with Gold Coast Suns, brother of Andrew
Ellen Swallow Richards née Ellen Swallow (1842–1911), American chemist
Emily Swallow (born 1979), American actress
Ian Swallow, English cricketer with Yorkshire, Somerset
James Swallow, British writer
Jerod Swallow, American figure skater
Jodie Swallow, British triathlete
John C. Swallow (born 1923), English oceanographer
Rachel Swallow, archaeologist and castellologist
Ray Swallow (born 1935), English cricketer with Derbyshire and footballer with Arsenal, Derby County
Ricky Swallow (born 1974), Australian sculptor
Roger Swallow (born 1946), British music producer
Silas C. Swallow (1839–1930), American preacher and politician
Steve Swallow (born 1940), American jazz bassist and composer